The 1856 Democratic National Convention was a presidential nominating convention that met from June 2 to June 6 in Cincinnati, Ohio. It was held to nominate the Democratic Party's candidates for president and vice president in the 1856 election. The convention selected former Secretary of State James Buchanan of Pennsylvania for president and former Representative John C. Breckinridge of Kentucky for vice president.

Incumbent Democratic President Franklin Pierce's standing with the public had been badly damaged by "Bleeding Kansas," the civil strife in Kansas Territory over slavery. Many dissatisfied Democrats lined up behind Buchanan, who had served as Pierce's ambassador to Britain and thus had avoided the controversy over Bleeding Kansas, while a smaller group of Democrats supported Senator Stephen A. Douglas of Illinois. Buchanan led on the first ballot and slowly grew his support on subsequent ballots, leading Pierce to instruct his delegates to back Douglas. Douglas agreed to withdraw his name after receiving assurances that Buchanan would not seek re-election in 1860, allowing Buchanan to clinch the nomination on the seventeenth ballot. Pierce became the first and only elected president who was an active candidate for reelection to be denied his party's nomination for a second term.

Eleven candidates received votes on the first vice presidential ballot, with Congressman John A. Quitman winning a plurality of the vote. The delegates lined up unanimously behind Breckinridge on the second ballot, giving him the vice presidential nomination. The Democratic ticket went on to win the 1856 election, defeating the Republican ticket of John C. Fremont and William L. Dayton and the American Party ticket of Millard Fillmore and Andrew J. Donelson.

Background 

The Democratic Party was wounded from its devastating losses in the 1854–1855 midterm elections. The party faced continued North-South sectional division over slavery-related issues, especially the Kansas–Nebraska Act of 1854 and subsequent violence known as "Bleeding Kansas" from the civil strife in the Kansas Territory during its campaign for statehood. Two notable Democratic politicians, President Pierce and Senator Stephen Douglas of Illinois, were seen as being at the center of the controversies, which led many party members to look elsewhere for a new compromise candidate for president.

James Buchanan had been a candidate for president at the 1852 Democratic National Convention, and after the 1852 election he agreed to serve as Pierce's ambassador to Britain. Buchanan's service abroad conveniently placed him outside of the country while the debate over the Kansas–Nebraska Act roiled the nation. Powerful Senators like John Slidell, Jesse Bright, and James A. Bayard lined up behind Buchanan, presenting him as an experienced leader who could appeal to the North and South. While Buchanan did not overtly seek the presidency, he also took no action to discourage his supporters.

Proceedings 
Called to order at noon on Monday, June 2, by the National Committee chair Robert Milligan McLane, Samuel Medary was made the temporary president. The first day, the convention appointed committees on credentials, organization, and resolutions.

On the second day the organization committee (John L. Dawson, chair) report was adopted and John Elliot Ward of Georgia was made the convention's president. The committee on credentials (James A. Bayard Jr., chair) settled a dispute over the Missouri delegation, but needed more time for the thorny problem of competing delegations from New York.

June 4 saw the adoption of a platform (former National Committee chair Benjamin F. Hallett headed the committee on resolutions); the domestic portions were supported unanimously, the foreign policy planks by large margins. A separately reported plank on a railroad to the Pacific coast failed by a vote of 120 to 154.

On June 5, the New York problem was finally settled by seating half of each of the competing delegations. Nominations for President were then made.

Presidential nomination

Presidential candidates 

On the first ballot, Pierce received 122 votes, many of them from the South, to Buchanan's 135, with Douglas and Lewis Cass receiving the remaining votes. By the following morning fourteen ballots had been completed, but none of the three main candidates were able to get two-thirds of the vote. Pierce, whose support had been slowly declining as the ballots passed, directed his supporters to break for Douglas, withdrawing his name in a last-ditch effort to defeat Buchanan. Douglas, only 43 years of age, believed that he could be nominated in 1860 if he let the older Buchanan win this time, and received assurances from Buchanan's managers that this would be the case. After two more deadlocked ballots, Douglas's managers withdrew his name, leaving Buchanan as the clear winner. To soften the blow to Pierce, the convention issued a resolution of "unqualified approbation" in praise of his administration. This loss marked the first (and to date, only) time in U.S. history that an elected president who was an active candidate for reelection was not nominated for a second term.

1st Day of Presidential Balloting / 4th Day of Convention (June 5, 1856)

2nd Day of Presidential Balloting / 5th Day of Convention (June 6, 1856)

Vice Presidential nomination

Vice Presidential candidates

Declined 

Eleven candidates were nominated for the vice presidency, but a number of them attempted to withdraw themselves from consideration, among them the eventual nominee, John C. Breckinridge of Kentucky. Breckinridge supported fellow Kentuckian Linn Boyd for the vice presidential nomination. However, following a draft effort led by the delegation from Vermont, Breckinridge was nominated on the second ballot. As Vermont's David Allen Smalley stated, "No Democrat has a right to refuse his services when his country calls."

Aftermath 
The Buchanan-Breckinridge ticket went on to win the 1856 presidential election, defeating John C. Fremont with William L. Dayton from the new Republican Party, and a strong third party showing from the American Party of the "Know Nothings" represented by former President Millard Fillmore and Andrew J. Donelson.

See also 
 History of the United States Democratic Party
 1856 Republican National Convention
 1856 Whig National Convention
 List of Democratic National Conventions
 U.S. presidential nomination convention
 1856 United States presidential election

References 

 Official proceedings of the National Democratic convention, held in Cincinnati, June 2–6, 1856

Works cited

External links 
 Democratic Party Platform of 1856 at The American Presidency Project
 Franklin Pierce at History.com

1856 United States presidential election
1856 in Ohio
19th century in Cincinnati
Conventions in Cincinnati
Political conventions in Ohio
Ohio Democratic Party
Political events in Ohio
Democratic National Conventions
1856 conferences
June 1856 events